Maxwell Township is located in Sangamon County, Illinois. As of the 2010 census, its population was 193 and it contained 72 housing units.  Maxwell Township formed from a portion of Loami Township on an unknown date, but sometime prior to 1921.

Geography

Demographics

References

External links
 US Census
 City-data.com
 Illinois State Archives

Townships in Sangamon County, Illinois
Springfield metropolitan area, Illinois
Townships in Illinois